Rahden is a town in the far north of North Rhine-Westphalia between Bielefeld and Bremen and between Hanover and Osnabrück. Rahden is part of the Minden-Lübbecke District in East Westphalia-Lippe.

Rahden was first mentioned in 1033 and 1816 to 1831 was county town of the district Rahden.

Geography
It is the northernmost town of North Rhine-Westphalia.

Town subdivisions 

The town of Rahden consists of 7 districts:
 Rahden (4,689 inhabitants)
 Kleinendorf (4,242 inhabitants)
 Varl (1,676 inhabitants)
 Sielhorst (791 inhabitants)
 Preußisch Ströhen (2,075 inhabitants)
 Wehe (1,730 inhabitants)
 Tonnenheide (1,784 inhabitants)

Mayors

Bert Honsel (CDU) was elected mayor in September 2015 with 61.1% of the votes.

International relations

Rahden is twinned with:
  Glindow (Berlin, Germany) -- since 1990
  Galgahévíz (Hungary) -- since 1995

Notable people 
 Tine Wittler (born 1973), German writer and television presenter

Honorary citizen
The only honorary citizen of Rahden is Professor  (d. 1950 Rahden). He was born in 1867 in the Great Village and was a prominent portrait painter, poet and the composer of the "New Westphalia March." A street in downtown Rahden is named after him.

Sons and daughters of the town 
The individuals listed here come from the city Rahden and have both regional, national or even international importance. Here, the list is not exhaustive.

(As far as possible, rather than the flat giving Rahden the origin of the respective municipality or later noted the district. By screenability each column is not just a last name in alphabetical order, but it can also be found quickly anniversary dates.)

References

External links

 Official site 

Minden-Lübbecke